Górki Małe may refer to several villages in Poland:
Górki Małe, Lubusz Voivodeship (west Poland)
Górki Małe, Silesian Voivodeship (south Poland)
Górki Małe, Łódź Voivodeship (central Poland)